The American Urological Association (AUA) is a professional association in the United States for urology professionals. It has its headquarters at the William P. Didusch Center for Urologic History in Maryland.

AUA works with many international organizations, representing urologists from across the world. These groups offer full or half day sessions, covering a variety of topics, during the annual meeting.

Awards
Hugh Hampton Young Award: Presented annually to an individual for outstanding contributions to the study of genitourinary tract disease. This award is sponsored by Karl Storz Endoscopy-America, Inc.
Ramon Guiteras Award: Awarded annually to an individual who is deemed to have made outstanding contributions to the art and science of urology. This award is sponsored by Bard Urological Division.
Distinguished Contribution Award: Presented annually to individuals who have made outstanding contributions to the science and practice of urology, including contributions made in a sub-specialty area, for military career service, or for humanitarian efforts.

Publications
The AUA publishes The Journal of Urology.

See also
William Didusch

References

External links
American Urological Association official website
American Urological Association Foundation official website
William P. Didusch Center for Urologic History official website

Medical associations based in the United States
Urology organizations
Medical and health organizations based in Maryland